The Second Taiwan Strait Crisis, also called the 1958 Taiwan Strait Crisis, was a conflict that took place between the People's Republic of China (PRC) and the Republic of China (ROC).  In this conflict, the PRC shelled the islands of Kinmen (Quemoy) and the Matsu Islands along the east coast of mainland China (in the Taiwan Strait) to "liberate" Taiwan from the Chinese Nationalist Party, also known as the Kuomintang (KMT); and to probe the extent of the United States defense of Taiwan's territory. A naval battle also took place around Dongding Island when the ROC Navy repelled an attempted amphibious landing by the PRC Navy.

U.S. Secretary of State Christian Herter (1959–1961) is said to have later referred to the conflict as "the first serious nuclear crisis".

Overview

The conflict was a continuation of the Chinese Civil War and First Taiwan Strait Crisis. The Republic of China (ROC) had begun to build military installations on the island of Kinmen (Quemoy) and the Matsu archipelago. The Chinese People's Liberation Army (PLA) began firing artillery at both Kinmen and some of the nearby Matsu islands.

On August 24 and 25, 1958 Chinese Communist and Chinese Nationalist forces clashed in the vicinity of Dongding Island, which the Nationalist troops controlled. The action was seen as an attempt by the communists to land on the island. This was the only naval and amphibious landing action during the crisis. The communist forces were repelled from taking the island. The action has also been seen as an attempt to draw Nationalist forces away from other areas.

In the days after shelling began, the American Joint Chiefs of Staff had determined to defend the islands even if the defense necessitated a nuclear response. Throughout the following weeks as the crisis continued to unfold, contingency plans were developed as it became clear that the critical issue was supplying Kinmen. In a meeting on September 2, Secretary of State John Foster Dulles met with the Joint Chiefs of Staff and other top officials to formulate an ongoing American strategy. The group determined that the use of nuclear weapons would ultimately be necessary for the defense of Kinmen, but that the United States should initially limit itself to using conventional forces. Throughout the crisis, coordination between American policymakers and military commanders was hampered by communication delays of days at a time, but by September American officials had authorized naval escorts to accompany ROC convoys up to 3 miles off Kinmen and begun to supply the ROC with advanced weapons. The Chinese Communists considered the escorts a violation of the territorial waters of the People's Republic of China. On September 19, Soviet Premier Nikita Khrushchev sent a letter warning that the American actions threatened world war, claiming that the Soviet Union would be forced to honor its commitments to the territorial integrity of Communist China. The letter was rejected by the American government.

The Eisenhower Administration responded to the request for aid from the ROC according to its obligations in the ROC-United States mutual defense treaty that had been ratified in 1954.  President Dwight D. Eisenhower ordered the reinforcement of the U.S. Navy Seventh Fleet in the area, and he ordered American naval vessels to help the Nationalist Chinese government to protect the supply lines to the islands. In addition, the U.S. Air Force deployed F-100D Super Sabres, F-101C Voodoos, F-104A Starfighters, and B-57B Canberras to Taiwan to demonstrate support for Taiwan. The F-104s were disassembled and airlifted to Taiwan in C-124 Globemaster II transport aircraft, marking the first time such a method was used to move fighter aircraft over a long distance.

By September 11, the artillery crisis was overall stabilized (even though numerous rounds of artillery would still be fired by Communist China almost daily for the next two months or so) because U.S. Navy warships started to escort ROC convoys to Kinmen, breaking the previous artillery blockade due to constant PRC artillery shells that prevented any air or naval relief for Kinmen. The PRC did not want to risk war with the United States so they refrained from firing on any convoys if they observed U.S. Navy ships. The biggest issues in the crisis after September 11 were the air battles and the success or failure of the naval convoys relieving the Kinmen garrison.

Also, under a secret effort called "Operation Black Magic", the U.S. Navy modified some of the F-86 Sabre fighters of the Nationalist Chinese Air Force with its newly developed early AIM-9 Sidewinder air-to-air missiles. These missiles gave the Nationalist Chinese pilots a decisive edge over the Chinese Communists' Soviet-made MiG-15 and MiG-17 fighters in the skies over the Matsu Islands and the Taiwan Strait. The Nationalist Chinese pilots used the Sidewinder missiles to score numerous kills on People's Liberation Army Air Force (PLAAF) MiG aircraft. The operation suffered blowback when one missile lodged in a MiG-17 without exploding, to be removed after landing and reverse-engineered into the Soviet K-13.

The US Army's contribution reinforced the strategic air defense capability of the Republic of China.  A provisional Nike missile battalion was organized at Fort Bliss, TX, and sent via USMTS  to Nationalist China. The 2nd Missile Battalion was augmented with detachments of signal, ordnance and engineers, totaling some 704 personnel. In addition, American ambassador Everett Drumwright advocated for a preemptive strike against PRC positions.

Twelve long-range  M115 howitzer artillery pieces and numerous 155 mm howitzers were transferred from the U.S. Marine Corps to the Army of the Nationalist China. These were sent west to Kinmen Island to gain superiority in the artillery duel back and forth over the straits there.

Soon, the Soviet Union dispatched its foreign minister, Andrei Gromyko, to Beijing to discuss the actions of the PLA and the PLAAF, with advice of caution to the Communist Chinese.

On , the Sidewinder missile was used for the first time in air-to-air combat as 32 Republic of China F-86s clashed with 100 PLAAF MiGs in a series of aerial engagements. 25 MiGs were shot down by Sidewinders, the first "kills" to be scored by air-to-air missiles in combat. In October more dogfights between ROC and PRC fighter jets occurred and the total airplane casualties during the crisis was 31 PRC MiGs shot down and 2 ROC F-86s shot down.

Soon, the People's Republic of China was faced with a stalemate, as the PLA's artillerymen had run out of artillery shells. However, on October 20 the PLA resumed artillery fire on Kinmen because a U.S. Navy warship had breached the PRC-declared 3 nautical miles exclusive zone from the coast of China that they claimed was a stipulation for their unilateral ceasefire agreement. Another more likely reason for the resumption of the PRC artillery bombardment was U.S. Secretary of State John Foster Dulles had arrived in Taipei to discuss the situation with the ROC government. The overall crisis finished by December 1958 when both the PRC and ROC troops settled into their eccentric alternating odd and even days firing period that lasted until 1979 when the United States and the PRC established diplomatic relations. Because both armies knew exactly what day, what time, and which areas would be attacked by artillery shells (military bases and artillery positions) the PRC and ROC troops were safe from harm due to hiding in bunkers thanks to this gentleman's agreement.

They remained there, conducting air operations from the WWII Japanese air strip until sometime in late April 1960 when they returned to Atsugi, Japan. They were joined at Pingtung by a reinforced rifle company from the Ninth Marines based on Okinawa.

Aftermath

Intermittently shelling until 1979
"On October 25, [the Chinese Communists] … declared that they would not fire on even-numbered days … if there were no American escort." This allowed Taiwan to resupply their military units on those islands on those days. Afterwards, both sides continued to bombard each other with shells containing propaganda leaflets on alternate days of the week. This strange informal arrangement continued until the normalization of diplomatic relations between the United States and the Communist People's Republic of China in 1979.  The timed shelling created little damage and casualties; it was mainly aimed at military compounds and artillery pieces. Sometimes during tense diplomatic moments PRC forces would revert to August/September 1958 levels of bombardment, temporarily breaking the normally scheduled non-lethal propaganda artillery shelling. One of these occasions happened in June 1960, when President Eisenhower visited Taipei. During Eisenhower's visit PRC forces fired over 100,000 artillery rounds onto Kinmen within a few days, killing 7 ROC soldiers and wounding 59, while 6 civilians perished and 15 were injured. ROC soldiers withheld their fire until after Eisenhower left Taipei. After his visit they retaliated by firing thousands of artillery rounds of their own onto mainland China from Kinmen. The PRC bombardment damaged 200 homes, five schools and a hospital on Kinmen, showing that during the 20 year period of mostly propaganda leaflets being fired by both sides it was still a very dangerous combat zone until 1979.

The crisis subsided and returned back to status quo ante bellum on December 2 when the U.S. Navy secretly and quietly removed their extra warships from the Taiwan Strait and the ROC Navy resumed unilateral combat and escort duties.

On August 23, 2019, the sixty-first anniversary of the beginning of the Second Taiwan Strait Crisis, President Tsai Ing-wen visited the Taiwushan Martyrs' Shrine where she placed flowers and offered incense.

During the crisis, American leadership risked the alienation of the American public, relations with key allies such as France and Japan, and even nuclear war. Secretary of State John Foster Dulles argued that while the status quo result was a victory, the American government could not permit such a situation to arise again. Other than the Third Taiwan Strait Crisis from 1995 to 1996 there has been no crisis involving the United States since 1958 in the Taiwan Strait.

See also
 Third Taiwan Strait Crisis
 List of battles over Kinmen
 Chinese Civil War
 Republic of China Armed Forces
 Kinmen knife
 Dongding Island

References

Citations

Sources
 Chen Jian. (2001). Mao's China and the Cold War – Beijing and the Taiwan Strait Crisis of 1958. The University of North Carolina Press.
 http://www.generals.dk/general/Qiu_Qing-quan/_/China.html
 Ministry of National Defense, R.O.C. 
 US Naval War College
 https://web.archive.org/web/20090326011824/http://cgsc.leavenworth.army.mil/carl/download/csipubs/bjorge_huai.pdf

Further reading
Bush, R. & O'Hanlon, M. (2007). A War Like No Other: The Truth About China's Challenge to America. Wiley. 
Bush, R. (2006). Untying the Knot: Making Peace in the Taiwan Strait. Brookings Institution Press. 
Carpenter, T. (2006). America's Coming War with China: A Collision Course over Taiwan. Palgrave Macmillan. 
Cole, B. (2006). Taiwan's Security: History and Prospects. Routledge. 
Copper, J. (2006). Playing with Fire: The Looming War with China over Taiwan. Praeger Security International General Interest. 
Federation of American Scientists et al. (2006). Chinese Nuclear Forces and U.S. Nuclear War Planning
Gill, B. (2007). Rising Star: China's New Security Diplomacy. Brookings Institution Press. 
Shirk, S. (2007). China: Fragile Superpower: How China's Internal Politics Could Derail Its Peaceful Rise. Oxford University Press. 
Tsang, S. (2006). If China Attacks Taiwan: Military Strategy, Politics and Economics. Routledge. 
Tucker, N.B. (2005). Dangerous Strait: the U.S.-Taiwan-China Crisis. Columbia University Press. 
 Watry, David M. Diplomacy at the Brink: Eisenhower, Churchill, and Eden in the Cold War. Baton Rouge: Louisiana State University Press, 2014.

External links

 http://www.globalsecurity.org/military/ops/quemoy_matsu-2.htm
 Mao Zedong's handling of the Taiwan Straits Crisis of 1958
 Khrushchev's Nuclear Promise to Beijing During the 1958 Crisis
 First and Second Taiwan Strait Crisis, Quemoy and Matsu Islands of Taiwan from the Cold War Museum
 The Communist Threat in the Taiwan Area Contemparary US government reaction
 YouTube – Taiwan After WW2 | US Army & Republic of China Army Prepare for War with China | Documentary

Crisis
Conflicts in 1958
Taiwan under Republic of China rule
Naval history of China
1958 in China
1958 in Taiwan
Presidency of Dwight D. Eisenhower
August 1958 events in Asia
September 1958 events in Asia
Cross-Strait conflict
China–United States military relations
Taiwan–United States military relations
Military history of Taiwan